Frederic Orendi (12 March 1930 – 1998) was a Romanian gymnast. He competed at the 1952 Summer Olympics and the 1964 Summer Olympics.

References

1930 births
1998 deaths
Romanian male artistic gymnasts
Olympic gymnasts of Romania
Gymnasts at the 1952 Summer Olympics
Gymnasts at the 1964 Summer Olympics
People from Mediaș
20th-century Romanian people